Alexander Morales Jr. (born November 21, 1997) is a Puerto Rican professional basketball player for the Lakeland Magic of the NBA G League. He played college basketball for the Wagner Seahawks.

High school career
Morales played basketball for Manchester Regional High School in Haledon, New Jersey, where he was a three-time All-State selection and led his team to a state sectional title. He was suspended for his senior season after allegedly being involved in an altercation at school.

College career
Morales averaged 13.8 points and 9.9 rebounds per game as a freshman at Prince George's Community College. He was a National Junior College Athletic Association (NJCAA) Division III Honorable Mention All-American and was named to the Second Team All-Maryland Junior College Athletic Conference. Morales led Prince George's to its first Maryland JUCO Tournament title since 1981, earning MVP honors. He did not play in the next season and was granted a redshirt. As a sophomore, Morales averaged 19.8 points, 11.9 rebounds and 5.5 assists per game. He was named a Second Team NJCAA Division III All-American and Maryland JUCO Player of the Year.

For his junior season, Morales moved to Wagner. As a junior, he averaged 13.6 points, 5.8 rebounds and 3.1 assists per game. Morales was named NEC Player of the Year as a senior, averaging 16.8 points, 7.2 rebounds and 4.3 assists per game. On April 16, 2021, he declared for the 2021 NBA draft while maintaining his college eligibility. Morales ultimately returned for his additional season of eligibility. He was again named NEC Player of the Year as well as Defensive Player of the Year.

Professional career

Lakeland Magic (2022–present)
After going undrafted in the 2022 NBA Draft, Morales joined the Orlando Magic for training camp, however he did not make the final roster. On November 3, 2022, Morales was named to the opening night roster for the Lakeland Magic.

Career statistics

College

NCAA Division I

|-
| style="text-align:left;"| 2019–20
| style="text-align:left;"| Wagner
| 28 || 25 || 30.6 || .440 || .366 || .706 || 5.8 || 3.1 || 1.1 || .3 || 13.6
|-
| style="text-align:left;"| 2020–21
| style="text-align:left;"| Wagner
| 20 || 20 || 35.4 || .440 || .317 || .713 || 7.2 || 4.3 || 1.8 || .5 || 16.8
|- class="sortbottom"
| style="text-align:center;" colspan="2"| Career
| 48 || 45 || 32.6 || .440 || .343 || .709 || 6.4 || 3.6 || 1.4 || .4 || 14.9

JUCO

|-
| style="text-align:left;"| 2016–17
| style="text-align:left;"| Prince George's CC
| 26 || 23 || 25.2 || .469 || .158 || .590 || 9.9 || 3.2 || 1.4 || .6 || 13.8
|-
| style="text-align:left;"| 2017–18
| style="text-align:left;"| Prince George's CC
| style="text-align:center;" colspan="11"|  Redshirt
|-
| style="text-align:left;"| 2018–19
| style="text-align:left;"| Prince George's CC
| 28 || 28 || 33.6 || .584 || .426 || .659 || 11.9 || 5.5 || 3.6 || .9 || 19.8
|- class="sortbottom"
| style="text-align:center;" colspan="2"| Career
| 54 || 51 || 29.6 || .533 || .363 || .627 || 11.0 || 4.4 || 2.5 || .8 || 16.9

References

External links
Wagner Seahawks bio
Prince George's CC Owls bio

1997 births
Living people
Basketball players from Paterson, New Jersey
Junior college men's basketball players in the United States
Lakeland Magic players
Puerto Rican men's basketball players
Shooting guards
Wagner Seahawks men's basketball players